Teresa Kalina (born 7 April 1952 in Wałcz) is a Polish politician and history teacher, from 2014 to 2018 she was a chairman of the West Pomeranian Regional Assembly.

Biography 
Teresa Kalina was born on 7 April 1952 in Wałcz. She has graduated in history from the Nicolaus Copernicus University in Toruń. She also completed postgraduate studies in organization and management at the Higher School of Public Administration in Szczecin and librarianship at the Pedagogical Study of Librarianship. From 1976 she worked as a tutor at the State Orphanage No. 3 in Szczecin, then as a history teacher and librarian. In the years 1991–2004 she was the deputy director of the Primary School No. 59, in the years 2004–2006 the headteacher of the Jan Twardowski Junior High School.

Political career 
In 2002 she became a member of the Civic Platform. In 2006, on CP's behalf, she was elected a deputy to the Szczecin City Council (she obtained 875 votes). She resigned from the mandate in 2010, because of the appointment of the head of Primary School No. 7.

In the 2010, 2014 and 2018 local government elections she has been elected to the West Pomeranian Regional Assembly. In March 2014, she was appointed chairman of the 4th term of the Assembly in place of Marek Tałasiewicz, and in December of the same year she became the chairman of the 5th term of the Assembly, obtaining 19 of 30 votes. In 2018 she was replaced by Maria Ilnicka-Mądry. In the Assembly, she is a member of Committee on Agriculture and Rural Development, Committee on Development, Promotion and International Cooperation, Committee on Education, Culture and Sport, and The Temporary Commission of the Badge of Honor of the West Pomeranian Griffin. She is also a Vice-chairman of the Committee on Agriculture and Rural Development.

In 2019, she ran for the Sejm without success. She obtained 1955 votes.

References 

Chairs of the West Pomeranian Regional Assembly
1952 births
Living people
Civic Platform politicians
21st-century Polish women politicians
Nicolaus Copernicus University in Toruń alumni
People from Wałcz